Jinnah Medical College Peshawar, Pakistan was established in 2002. It was recognized by the Pakistan Medical and Dental Council on 16 January 2009. It is affiliated with Khyber Medical University, Peshawar. The main building, apart from administration offices, houses the departments of basic sciences of anatomy, physiology, biochemistry as well as the library, seminar rooms, auditorium, lecture rooms, dissection hall, cafeteria and the college mosque.

Many of graduates of Jinnah Medical College are working in different hospitals across KPK, Pakistan.

However, due to lack of infrastructure, the college's registration was cancelled and is in process of inspection and approval from the Pakistan Medical and Dental Council since 2018.

References

Khyber Medical University
Medical colleges in Khyber Pakhtunkhwa
2002 establishments in Pakistan
Educational institutions established in 2002
Universities and colleges in Peshawar
Universities and colleges in Khyber Pakhtunkhwa
Universities and colleges in Peshawar District
Memorials to Muhammad Ali Jinnah